Prafulla Roy (born September 11, 1934) is a West Bengali author. He had to struggle hard to set foot in a new land. He traveled all over the country to experience the struggles of the people. And for this purpose he lived for some time among the indigenous people of Nagaland, who were the untouchables of Bihar and the rootless people of the mainland of the Andamans. Most of which later appeared flawlessly in his writings.

Early life
Prafulla Roy was born on 11 September 1934 in the village of Atpara, Bikrampur, in 1934 in the former East Bengal district of Dhaka. He moved to India in 1950. He resides in Kolkata.

Author 
Roy's writings portray powerful realities in both urban and rural conditions. He has written over 150 books, including novels and short stories. His first novel was Purva Parvati, written in Nagaland and published in 1956. He penned novels on refugee life, such as Keya Patar Nauko (2003), Shatdharay Boye Yay (2006), Uttal Samayer Itikatha (2014), Nona Jal Mithe Mati (Bang 136). Although it differs in form and name from Kayapatar Nauka, Shatdharaya Boye Yaya, Uttal Samay Itikatha, it is actually a trilogy.

From 1986 to 1989, at the initiative of Monindra Roy, Keya patar Nauko was continuously published in Amrit Patrika.

Adaptations 
About 45 telefilms, tele-series, and feature-films were made based on his novels. Among his notable works are Bagh Bondi Khela (1975), Mohana Dike (1984), Aadmi Aur Aurat (1984), Ekanta Apan (1987), Charachar (1994), Target (1996), Mondo Meyer Upakhyan (2003), Krantikaal (2005), Pitribhumi (2007).

India produced a serial drama of the same name based on his novel Keya Patar Nouko, which aired on Indian Channel Zee Bangla .

Awards 
 Bankim Puraskar for his novel Akasher Neeche Manush (1985)
 Sahitya Akademi Award for his novel Krantikal (2003)
 Bhualka Puraskar
 Matilal Puraskar

See also 
 Bankim Puraskar
 List of Sahitya Akademi Award winners for Bengali

References 

Indian novelists
Bengali writers
Bengali novelists
Recipients of the Sahitya Akademi Award in Bengali
1934 births
Living people
 Writers from Kolkata